Diplotaxodon greenwoodi is a species of haplochromine cichlid which is endemic to Lake Malawi.  It occurs in the reef and shelf zones of the lake where it preys on small cichlids. The specific name honours the English ichthyologist Peter Humphry Greenwood (1927-1995).

References

greenwoodi
Fish of Malawi
Fish of Lake Malawi
Cichlid fish of Africa
Taxa named by Jay Richard Stauffer Jr.
Taxa named by Kenneth Robert McKaye
Fish described in 1986
Taxonomy articles created by Polbot